I Am... Sasha Fierce is the third studio album by American singer Beyoncé. It was released on November 12, 2008, by Columbia Records and Music World Entertainment. In its original release, the album was formatted as a double album, intending to market Beyoncé's dichotomous artistic persona. The first disc I Am... contains slow and midtempo pop and R&B ballads, while the second, Sasha Fierce (named after Beyoncé's on-stage alter ego), focuses on more uptempo beats that blend electropop and Europop elements. In composing the songs' lyrics, Beyoncé worked with writers, with each session accompanied by live orchestration.

Beyoncé credited both her husband—rapper Jay-Z—and jazz singer Etta James for inspiring her to push the limits of her songwriting and artistry. Musically, I Am... drew inspiration from folk and alternative rock, while blending acoustic guitar elements into contemporary ballads, and its tracks were written and produced by Beyoncé, during collaborative efforts with Babyface, Tricky Stewart, The-Dream and Ryan Tedder. Sasha Fierce boasted production from Darkchild and Sean Garrett.

I Am... Sasha Fierce received mixed to positive  reviews from music critics and was a massive commercial success, debuting at number one on the US Billboard 200 chart with first-week sales of 482,000 units and earning Beyoncé her third consecutive US number-one solo album. The album has earned one diamond and over thirty platinum certifications in separate worldwide markets, being certified six-times platinum by the Recording Industry Association of America (RIAA) after shipping over six million units in the United States. I Am... Sasha Fierce has sold 10 million copies worldwide, making it one of the best-selling albums of the 21st century. The album garnered seven Grammy Award nominations at the 52nd Annual Grammy Awards ceremony (2010), including a nomination for Album of the Year, winning six—the most awards won in one night by a female artist.

The album was marketed with the release of several singles, including "If I Were a Boy" and "Single Ladies (Put a Ring on It)", both of which charted highly internationally. The former topped the charts in over ten countries and reached number three on the Billboard Hot 100, with the latter becoming her fifth number-one single on the Hot 100 chart. "Diva" and "Ego" were released exclusively in the United States, while "Halo" and "Sweet Dreams" were promoted internationally as the third and fourth singles, respectively. "Broken-Hearted Girl" was released internationally as the fifth single, while "Video Phone" was released in September 2009 as the overall eighth, and "Why Don't You Love Me" was released in July 2010 as the ninth and final single. To further promote the album, Beyoncé made several award show and televised appearances across Europe and America, and embarking on the worldwide I Am... World Tour (2009–10).

Recording and production 

The recording of the album took place over an eight-month period. Beyoncé recorded the album in sessions at Bangladesh Studios, PatchWerk Recording Studios, Silent Sound Studios and Tree Sound Studios in Atlanta, Georgia; Chung King Studios, Electric Lady Studios, Roc the Mic Studios and Strawberrybee Productions in New York City, New York; GAD Studios in Ibiza, Spain; Mansfield Studios and The Campground in Los Angeles, California; South Beat Studios in Miami Beach, Florida; and The Boom Boom Room in Burbank, California. Beyoncé either co-wrote or co-produced all material on I Am... Sasha Fierce. She collaborated with several record producers and songwriters, including Babyface, Stargate (production duo composed of Tor Erik Hermansen and Mikkel Storleer Eriksen), Tricky Stewart, The-Dream, Darkchild, Sean Garrett, Solange Knowles, Jim Jonsin, Rico Love, Ryan Tedder, Bangladesh, Ian Dench, Dave McCracken, Wayne Wilkins and Blac Elvis. Beyoncé also collaborated with some musicians she had never worked with in the past, such as Toby Gad and BC Jean on "If I Were a Boy"; she also worked again with Amanda Ghost on "Disappear".

For the I Am... disc, Beyoncé was influenced by folk and alternative rock genres, while incorporating other instruments she had not normally used previously, such as the acoustic guitar. Tedder specifically assisted Beyoncé with crafting the album's balladry. The ballads were crafted in a way to combine "the best elements" of pop and soul music, while simultaneously "expanding the possibilities of both genres". Beyoncé attempted something different as people had strong expectations from her; she experimented with stronger lyrics. Beyoncé worked with Ghost to re-write Franz Schubert's "Ave Maria" after having co-written "Disappear" in London, England. Ghost told The Daily Telegraph that they were both inspired by their then-recent marriages and had walked down the aisle to "Ave Maria". The song "Smash Into You", featured on the deluxe edition of the album, was originally slated to appear on Jon McLaughlin's sophomore album OK Now under the name "Smack Into You", but was cut from the finalized tracklist after it was leaked online and was subsequently given to Knowles.

During the nine-month period between November 2007 and August 2008, Beyoncé recorded over seventy songs and decided during the editing process that she did not want to reconcile the two approaches into one disc. If a song was meaningless to her, she would cut it off during the process of elimination for the final track listing. After a process of elimination, twelve tracks were selected to be placed on the standard edition of the album, while five additional tracks were chosen to make the final cut for the deluxe edition of the album. Beyoncé later revealed that songs from established producers like The Neptunes and Danja were not able to make the final cut.

Music and lyrics 
In an interview for Billboard magazine, Beyoncé described I Am... Sasha Fierce as a double album. She said, "One side has songs that are more mainstream and another has my more traditional R&B songs for my fans who've been there the whole time. Some of it sounds like Barbra Streisand, Karen Carpenter and The Beatles around the 1970s." Music writer Andy Kellman of AllMusic viewed its first disc as "essentially a small set of adult contemporary ballads. Acoustic guitars, pianos, strings, contemplative soul searching, and grand sweeping gestures fill it out, with more roots in '[19]70s soft rock than soul." The second disc, Sasha Fierce, contains consistent electronic influences, which are displayed in songs like "Radio" and "Sweet Dreams". Kellman said in his review that "Diva" resembles B'Day'''s "Freakum Dress" or "Ring the Alarm" in terms of audacity. Despite being on the Sasha Fierce disc, "Ego", "Why Don't You Love Me" and "Scared of Lonely" were noted to be a meeting ground between the album's halves. According to Jennifer Vineyard of MTV News, they resemble Sasha Fierce musically, but thematically and lyrically, they are vulnerable like Beyoncé on the I Am... disc. The album formally introduces Beyoncé's alter ego Sasha Fierce. She revealed that Sasha was born during the making of her hit single "Crazy in Love" (2003). In an interview with Emmet Sullivan of People magazine, Beyoncé affirmed that her alter ego is strictly for the stage, with the editor describing Sasha Fierce as the singer's sensual, aggressive alter ego.

"If I Were a Boy", the first single of I Am..., stands as the only song on either disc that Beyoncé did not co-write. BC Jean, who wrote most of the song's lyrics, took inspiration from a poor relationship. Beyoncé explained in Essence that "If I Were a Boy" is different from her previous songs in the sense that it is not a traditional R&B song. Music critics remarked that the song seemed to be a mixture of her hit single "Irreplaceable" (2006), Fergie's single "Big Girls Don't Cry" (2007), and Ciara's single "Like a Boy" (2007). Ann Powers of the Los Angeles Times saw the song's theme of female empowerment as an expansion on that of "Irreplaceable". Musically, "Single Ladies" is an upbeat-dance-pop and R&B song, and features dancehall and bounce influences. According to Jonah Weiner of Blender, the song makes a clear reference to marriage while Greg Kot of the Chicago Tribune felt that the lyrics had a connection with "post-breakup". "Halo", composed by Ryan Tedder and Evan Bogart, was initially intended for Beyoncé but was almost recorded by Leona Lewis due to Beyoncé's schedule. According to Christian Williams of Billboard, "Halo" has a mainstream pop sound, with subtle R&B undertones. "Ave Maria" samples Franz Schubert's "Ave Maria". Critics noted "Diva" as a variation on Lil Wayne's "A Milli" and coined it as its female counterpart. "Diva" carries a stuttering beat.
"Sweet Dreams" was critically acclaimed for its use of electronic bassline, which some critics compared to Michael Jackson's "Beat It" because of its electropop sound. "Sweet Dreams" is derived from contemporary R&B and incorporates influences from the classic 1980s funk. "Broken-Hearted Girl" is a midtempo piano ballad. Its production and melody is backed by strings and a drum machine beat. According to Spence D. of IGN Music, "Hello" comes off like another ballad that "populate[s] the first part of the album." It contains the Jerry Maguire line – "You had me at hello" – as part of its chorus. It essentially consists of "sweet guitar-picking and delicate harmonies." According to critics, "Video Phone" contains lyrics that are in reference to "a celebration of Skype sex and putting on a solo show, on camera, for a guy you just met at the club". The remixed version featured both Beyoncé and Lady Gaga trading verses with one another. Musically the song consists of simple lyrics, with hidden innuendos, and is backed by thin-spread beats; Beyoncé and Gaga uttering gasps and groans while singing the song. "Disappear" consists of "sweet guitar-picking and delicate harmonies". "That's Why You're Beautiful" is a slow-tempo soft rock and rock power ballad, which consists of a "grungy" guitar riff and stuterring drums. Critics compared the song with the materials by Alice in Chains and Jill Scott. The platinum edition of the album also included a cover version of Billy Joel's song "Honesty" (1979).

 Title and artwork 

The album was titled I Am... Sasha Fierce to showcase the difference between Beyoncé and her alter ego Sasha Fierce; the first disc is titled I Am... while the second is titled Sasha Fierce.

Making comparisons to a magazine, Beyoncé elaborated that the record was a double album and that it had two covers. The cover artworks for the standard, deluxe and platinum editions of I Am... Sasha Fierce were all shot by German photographer Peter Lindbergh.

In a 2021 interview for Harper's Bazaar, Beyoncé revealed that she based the entire project on black and white photography after being told in a meeting discussing analytics that a research discovered that her fans did not like when her photography was black and white. She stated that "it pissed her off that an agency could dictate what her fans wanted based on a survey", pointing out that she was "so exhausted and annoyed with these formulaic corporate companies" and highlighting the album's subsequent great commercial success.

 Release and promotion 

Beyoncé promoted I Am... Sasha Fierce through various televised appearances and awards ceremonies by performing songs featured on the album from late 2008 until early 2010. Beyoncé's father and then-manager Mathew Knowles held a listening party for the album in New York City on October 22, 2008. Beyoncé first promoted "Single Ladies (Put a Ring on It)" in a concert organized by the Power 105.1 radio station on October 29. Beyoncé first performed "If I Were a Boy" on October 31, on the Japanese music television program Music Station. She later performed “If I Were a Boy” on November 6, at the 2008 MTV Europe Music Awards. Soon after, she sang "If I Were a Boy" and "Single Ladies (Put a Ring on It)" on November 9, at the 2008 World Music Awards in Monaco. She then took to the stage of The Oprah Winfrey Show to perform "If I Were a Boy" on November 13. She appeared on Saturday Night Live on November 15, where she sang "Single Ladies (Put a Ring on It)". On November 16, Beyoncé sang a medley of "If I Were a Boy", "Single Ladies (Put a Ring on It)", and "Crazy in Love" during the final episode of Total Request Live. I Am... Sasha Fierce was released in the United States on November 18, 2008, and previously in Japan on November 12, in Australia and Germany on November 14, and in France and the United Kingdom on November 17; deluxe edition of the album was released simultaneously with the standard edition. Beyoncé performed "Single Ladies (Put a Ring on It)" on BET's 106 & Park on November 18, at the 2008 American Music Awards on November 23, on The Ellen DeGeneres Show on November 25, on Today the following day, and on The Tyra Banks Show with two male dancers, on January 9, 2009. Beyoncé's first live performance of "Halo" was at the 40th NAACP Image Awards on February 12, 2009. She later performed the song on the Late Show with David Letterman after an interview on April 22, 2009.

On June 16, 2009, Above and Beyoncé: Video Collection & Dance Mixes was released, composed of a CD of dance remixes to the singles from the album, including the remix of "Ego" with rapper Kanye West, and a DVD featuring music videos previously released for those singles, as well as behind-the-scenes footage. Beyoncé was due to perform "Sweet Dreams" at the 2009 MTV Video Music Awards on September 13; however, she only performed the bridge from the song at the beginning of her performance, before switching to "Single Ladies (Put a Ring on It)". The platinum edition of I Am... Sasha Fierce was released in Australia on Beyoncé's twenty-eighth birthday on September 4, 2009, and in the United States on October 20, 2009; it included a cover version of Billy Joel's song "Honesty" (1979). Beyoncé performed "Sweet Dreams" at the 2009 MTV Europe Music Awards on November 5. The deluxe edition of I Am... Sasha Fierce was reissued in the United States on November 23, 2009, including all of the previously released songs in addition to the new songs "Poison" and the remix of "Video Phone" with Lady Gaga. An extended play (EP) titled I Am... Sasha Fierce – The Bonus Tracks was released the same day for digital download in the United States, featuring the latter songs, along with Why Don't You Love Me. Beyoncé performed "If I Were a Boy" on January 31, 2010, at the 52nd Annual Grammy Awards ceremony, along with a cover of Alanis Morissette's song "You Oughta Know" (1995). In February 2010, the bonus track "Why Don't You Love Me" from the album's multiple reissues, climbed up the US Dance Club Songs, eventually taking the top spot and becoming Beyoncé's thirteenth number-one hit on the chart. On May 4, 2010, a full-length music video appeared online after its release as a promotional single.

To further promote the album, Beyoncé embarked on the I Am... World Tour, which started in Edmonton, Canada on March 26, 2009. The European leg of the tour started on April 26 in Zagreb, Croatia, and ended on June 9 in London, England. On June 21, she began the third leg of the tour in the United States and finished in August with the I Am... Yours four-day revue at Encore Las Vegas on the Las Vegas Strip. Starting on September 15, 2009, the fourth leg began in Melbourne, Australia and finished on September 24 in Perth, Australia. Beyoncé then went on to perform in Asia, the Middle East, Europe, Africa, and the United Kingdom, before finishing the 2009 portion of the tour on November 24 in Belfast, Northern Ireland. The tour had its final leg in February 2010, visiting Latin America. Starting on February 4 in Florianópolis, Brazil, she visited five other places before ending in Trinidad on February 18. According to Pollstar, the 2010 shows earned $17.2 million, which added to the total of $86 million for the first 86 concerts in 2009, bringing the tour total to $103.2 million for 97 shows. The I Am... Yours residency at the Encore Theater in Las Vegas was recorded on August 2, 2009, and later released as a DVD, audio CD and television special in late November 2009 titled I Am... Yours: An Intimate Performance at Wynn Las Vegas. Various performances on the tour were filmed worldwide for a live DVD, I Am... World Tour, which was released on November 30, 2010.

 Singles 

On October 8, 2008, Beyoncé premiered two lead singles from the album. "If I Were a Boy" peaked at number three on the US Billboard Hot 100, topped eight charts worldwide and reached the top ten on many other charts. "Single Ladies (Put a Ring on It)" was the second lead single and peaked at number one on the US Billboard Hot 100, becoming Beyoncé's fifth number-one single, and was also successful in other international markets, peaking within the top ten around the world. The singles were certified double platinum and quadruple platinum, respectively, by the Recording Industry Association of America (RIAA). "Diva" was released exclusively in the United States and peaked at number nineteen on the US Billboard Hot 100, becoming Beyoncé's twelfth top-twenty single, and at number three on the US Hot R&B/Hip-Hop Songs. It was certified gold by the RIAA. The next single, "Halo", was released internationally and peaked at number five on the US Billboard Hot 100, proving to be commercially successful and reaching top ten around the world. It was certified double platinum by the RIAA on January 5, 2010.

Following announcements of the I Am... World Tour two more singles were initially lined up, namely "Broken-Hearted Girl" and "Sweet Dreams"—though they switched order to become the sixth and seventh singles, respectively. "Sweet Dreams" reached the top ten in most countries, including the United States, managing to top the New Zealand Singles Chart,  and was certified platinum by the RIAA on January 5, 2010. "Broken-Hearted Girl", the seventh single, reached the top forty on charts around the world, despite never being certified nor released in the United States. "Video Phone" was released as the eighth single from I Am... Sasha Fierce on September 22, 2009, with an accompanying music video and digital download release, taking form as an extended remix featuring American recording artist Lady Gaga. Like its predecessor, it reached the top-forty on charts around the world, peaking at number sixty-five on the US Billboard Hot 100. It also became Beyoncé's fourteenth number-one on the US Hot Dance Club Songs. "Why Don't You Love Me" was released as the ninth and final single on July 2, 2010, and peaked atop the US Hot Dance Club Songs, before its official single release. As of July 2010, the digital tracks from the album had sold a combined total of 12.3 million units in the United States; and according to Columbia Records the album has sold fifteen million digital singles worldwide.

 Critical reception I Am... Sasha Fierce received mixed to positive reviews from critics. At Metacritic, which assigns a normalized rating out of 100 to reviews from mainstream publications, the album received an average score of 62 (indicating "generally favorable reviews"), based on 24 reviews. Slant Magazines Sal Cinquemani wrote that the album's "strength" is "its individual songs ... a testament to Beyoncé as one of today's most reliable singles artists", but felt that "the real disparity is her inability to reconcile the adult-contemporary schmaltz of I Am with the more modern, edgy sounds of Sasha Fierce." Adam Mattera of The Observer felt that both discs lack depth, observing that the first is "too busy chasing radio formats to expose any genuine soul", and criticizing the second disc's "succession of independent woman anthems such as 'Single Ladies' and 'Diva', which will no doubt inspire drag queens the world over but leave most others bemused." AllMusic's Andy Kellman called its double-disc "gimmick" "flimsy" and favored its second disc's "decent, if easily forgettable, upbeat pop." He expressed that on the I Am... disc, "Beyoncé feels each line to the fullest extent, which almost rescues the set's staidness." In his consumer guide for MSN Music, Robert Christgau named it the "dud of the month", indicating "a bad record whose details rarely merit further thought". He found its "split-personality bit" to be "deeply vapid", only observing "three good songs on this 11-track artifact".

Jonah Weiner of Blender commented that "Beyoncé is still a beauty-shop feminist, quick with the smack-downs, and she still describes the rattling rush of love with preternatural poise". Stacey Anderson of Spin commented that its first disc "meanders over [...] down-tempo cuts" and called ... Sasha "an intriguing but diluted direction". The Village Voices Nana Ekua Brew-Hammond felt that the I Am... disc lacks cohesion, but complimented "Sasha Fierce as "brassy, big-headed, confrontational, and witty," and stated, "each incendiary track challenges you to leave your inhibitions at coat-check." Christian Hoard of Rolling Stone noted that its slow songs are "full of bland self-affirmation and saggy lines", but wrote that "the "Sasha" disc boasts Beyoncé's most adventurous music yet". Colin McGuire of PopMatters called the album "a little rough around the edges at times" and viewed its Sasha Fierce disc as "a far more compelling trip down dance-lane". Leah Greenblatt of Entertainment Weekly wrote that the album offers "two compelling sides" of Beyoncé and stated: "The collection might have been better served had she edited it down to one disc, rather than belabor what ultimately seems like a marketing gimmick. And while fans will surely speculate, there's little in the lyrics that feels more revealing than previous emotional fire-starters." Sasha Frere-Jones from The New Yorker found the album to be "something of a mess", mostly because the alter ego "trips on the idea of redefinition".

 Accolades 

Leah Greenblatt of Entertainment Weekly ranked I Am… Sasha Fierce at number two on her list "10 Best CDs of 2008", stating that "'If I Were a Boy' and 'Single Ladies (Put a Ring on It)' are undoubtedly album highlights; still, the surprise here is how consistently satisfying the rest of it is – even the less showy tracks blossom on repeated listening." Mark Edward Nero of About.com ranked it at the ninth place on his list of the Best R&B Albums of 2008. Christian Gerard of NBC Washington placed I Am... Sasha Fierce on his list of "Honorable Mentions" while writing the list "Best Albums of 2008". Agence France-Presse, as reported by ABS-CBN News and Current Affairs, recognized I Am... Sasha Fierce as the twelfth best-selling album of 2008. On The Village Voices Pazz & Jop year-end lists, I Am... Sasha Fierce was ranked at numbers three-hundred-and-thirty-three and five-hundred-and-eighty in 2008 and 2009, respectively. The album was ranked at number twelve on the list of the best albums of the 2000s decade in Rolling Stones Reader's Poll. The writers of Entertainment Weekly ranked I Am... Sasha Fierce at number eight on their list "10 Best Albums of the Decade".I Am... Sasha Fierce won a Soul Train Music Award for Best Album of the Year at the 2009 Soul Train Music Awards. Beyoncé won the American Music Award for Favorite Soul/R&B Female Artist at the American Music Awards of 2009, while I Am... Sasha Fierce garnered a nomination for Favorite Soul/R&B Album. Beyoncé also won a BET Award for Best R&B Artist at the BET Awards 2009. However, she lost the same award to Alicia Keys at the following ceremony. Similarly, Beyoncé was nominated for Brit Award for International Female Solo Artist at the 2009 Brit Awards, for a Meteor Music Award for Best International Female at the 2009 Meteor Awards, and for International Dance Music Awards for Best Artist (Solo) and Best R&B/Urban Dance Track for "Sweet Dreams" at the 25th Annual International Dance Music Awards (2010). At the MOBO Awards 2009, Beyoncé won the MOBO Award for Best International Act and I Am... Sasha Fierce was nominated for Best Album. Beyoncé won an MTV Europe Music Award for Best Female, "Single Ladies (Put a Ring on It)" won Best Video and "Halo" won Best Song at the 2009 MTV Europe Music Awards.I Am... Sasha Fierce was nominated for the NAACP Image Award for Outstanding Album at the 40th NAACP Image Awards (2009), and for an NRJ Music Award for International Album of the Year at the NRJ Music Awards 2010. Beyoncé was also nominated for a  People's Choice Award for Favorite Female Artist and Favorite R&B Artist at the 36th People's Choice Awards (2010), as well as winning a Teen Choice Award for Choice Music: R&B Artist at the 2010 Teen Choice Awards, and being nominated for World's Best R&B Artist at the 2010 World Music Awards. I Am... Sasha Fierce and its singles earned Beyoncé seven Grammy Award nominations at the 52nd Annual Grammy Awards (2010), including Album of the Year. She won a record-setting six Grammy Awards out of seven, and an award for her rendition of the classic Etta James' song "At Last", from the Cadillac Records soundtrack.

 Commercial performance I Am... Sasha Fierce debuted at number one on the US Billboard 200, selling 482,000 copies in its first week and giving Beyoncé her third consecutive number-one album in the United States. With this, Beyoncé became the third female artist of the 2000s to have her first three albums debut atop the US Billboard 200. Having sold 1,459,000 copies in six weeks of release by the end of 2008, I Am... Sasha Fierce emerged as the tenth best-selling album of the year according to Billboard. With this achievement, Beyoncé eventually equaled Garth Brooks, Mariah Carey, and Shania Twain for placing an album in Nielsen SoundScan's year-end top ten for the fifth time. The album later emerged as the second best-selling album of 2009 in the United States itself. It has been certified six-times platinum by the Recording Industry Association of America (RIAA). As of July 2022, I Am... Sasha Fierce has sold 8.12 million album-equivalent units in the United States. In the United Kingdom, the album debuted at number ten on November 29, 2008, becoming Beyoncé's lowest-debuting album despite having higher first-week sales than her previous album, B'Day (2006). Following her performance at The X Factor fifth season finale with winner Alexandra Burke, the album moved up to number nine on December 27, 2008. Due to the success of its singles in the United Kingdom, particularly "Sweet Dreams", I Am... Sasha Fierce rose from number five to its highest peak of number two in its thirty-ninth week on the chart, which was the week of August 16, 2009. It is her best-selling album in the United Kingdom, having sold over 1.5 million copies. It was certified six times platinum by the British Phonographic Industry.

In Australia, I Am... Sasha Fierce debuted at number nine on November 24, 2008 and peaked at number eight on January 5, 2009. Following the success of singles "Sweet Dreams" and "Broken-Hearted Girl", the album rebounded to a new peak of number three on two separate occasions in October 2009. It was later certified quadruple platinum by the Australian Recording Industry Association (ARIA). In New Zealand, the album debuted at number sixteen on November 24, 2008 and initially peaked at number six on March 2, 2009. After growing popularity of its singles, especially "Sweet Dreams", the album upped to a new peak of number three on September 21, 2009. The album was certified platinum by the Recording Industry Association of New Zealand (RIANZ) on April 26, 2009 (after twenty-three weeks on the chart), shipping over 15,000 copies to retailers and was later certified double platinum. In Spain, the album debuted and peaked at number seven on November 26, 2008, and was certified platinum by the Productores de Música de España (PROMUSICAE) for shipments of over 60,000 copies on October 26, 2009. The album was also the best-selling international album of 2009 in Turkey. The album experienced massive success in Brazil, topping the country's year-end chart and being certified double diamond for sales in excess of 500,000 copies by Pro-Música Brasil. The album has sold over ten million copies worldwide. As of February 2017, the album has generated over 1 billion streams.

 Track listing 

 I Am... 

 Sasha Fierce 

 I Am... Sasha Fierce 

 Personnel 
Credits adapted from the liner notes of I Am... Sasha Fierce''.

 Beyoncé –  lead vocals, background vocals (track 2.08); A&R, executive producer, arrangement, audio production  (tracks 1.01-06, 1.07–08, 2.01–08); vocal production (tracks 1.06, 2.01)
 Mathew Knowles –  A&R, executive producer
 Max Gousse –  A&R
 Juli Knapp –  A&R administration
 Alexandra Velella –  A&R coordination
 Jake McKim –  artist coordination
 Beyoncé – executive producer
 Quincy Jackson –  marketing
 Tim Blacksmith –  management
 Danny D – management
 Rico Love – background vocals  (2.04), audio production, vocal production (2.02, 2.04)
 Jim Caruana – background vocals (1.04); recording engineer (tracks 1.03, 1.08, 2.04, instrumental: 1.06, 2.02), mixing (track 1.08); Jim Caruana (tracks 1.01-02, 1.06–07, 2.01–03, 2.05–08, Additional- 1.04)
 Fusako Chubachi – art direction
 Jean-Paul Gaultier – clothing design
 Thierry Mugler – clothing design
 Kimberly Kimble – hair stylist
 ilovedust – logo design
 Francesca Tolot – make-up
 Manicurist – Lisa Logan – manicurist
 Peter Lindbergh – photography
 Ty Hunter – stylist
 Jens Gad – drums (live-track 1.01)
 Steven J. – drums (1.07)
 Syience – drums, guitar (1.01)
 Ian Dench – guitar (track 1.05); audio production (1.03, 1.07)
 Philip Margiziotis – additional horns (track 2.07)
 Donald Hayes – saxophone (track 2.07)
 Dontae Winslow – trumpet (track 2.07)
 Stargate – other instrumentation, recording engineer, production (1.04-05)
 Toby Gad – instrumentation (1.01); arrangement (track 1.01); recording engineer (instrumental: 1.01); production
 Andrew Hey – instrumentation, recording engineer (1.08); production
 Darkchild – instrumentation, production, mixing (2.08)
 Ryan Tedder – arrangement, engineer, instrumentation and audio production (1.02)
 Tricky Stewart  – audio production (1.06, 2.01)
 Dave McCracken – audio production (1.03, 1.07)
 Amanda Ghost – audio production (1.03, 1.07)
 Wayne Wilkins – audio production, mixing (2.04)
 Bangladesh  – audio production (2.03, 2.05)
 Sean Garrett  – audio production (2.03, 2.05)
 The-Dream – audio production (1.06, 2.01)
 D-Town – audio production
 BC Jean – audio production
 Kuk Harrell – recording engineer (1.06, 2.01)
 Jim Jonsin – recording engineer  (instrumental: 2.02); mixing, production (2.04)
 Miles Walker – recording engineer  (instrumental: 2.03, 2.05)
 Brian "B Luv" Thomas – recording engineer  (instrumental: 1.06, 2.01)
 Marcos Tovar – recording engineer  (1.03, instrumental: 1.07)
 David Quiñones – recording engineer  (instrumental: 2.06)
 Mack Woodard – recording engineer  (instrumental: 2.07)
 Mike "Handz" Donaldson – recording engineer  (instrumental: 2.08)
 Roberto "Tito" Vasquez – recording engineer  (instrumental: 2.08)
 Radio Killa – recording engineer
 Kory Aaron – assistant engineer (tracks 2.03, 2.05)
 Christian Baker – assistant engineer (1.02)
 David Boyd – assistant engineer (1.08)
 Michael Miller – assistant engineer (2.03, 2.05)
 Johntá Austin – assistant engineer
 Lady Gaga – assistant engineer
 Tom Coyne – mastering
 Matt Green – mixing
 Dave Pensado – mixing (2.01)
 Mark "Spike" Stent – mixing (1.01-05, 1.07, 2.02–03, 2.05–08)
 Andrew Wuepper – mixing, mix assistant (2.01)
 Randy Urbanski – mixing, mix assistant (2.01)
 Jaycen Joshua – mixing (2.01)
 Matt Green – mix assistant (tracks 1.01-05, 1.07, 2.02–03, 2.05–08)
 Bama Boyz – producer
 Harold Lilly – production (2.07)
 Ramon Owen – production (2.06)
 Blac Elvis – production  (2.07)
 Radio Killa – production
 Lisa Logan – other contributions

Charts

Weekly charts

Monthly charts

Year-end charts

Decade-end charts

All-time charts

Certifications and sales

Release history

See also 
 Album era
 List of Billboard 200 number-one albums of 2008
 List of Billboard number-one R&B albums of 2008
 List of number-one urban albums of 2008 (Australia)
 List of number-one albums of 2009 (Ireland)
 List of number-one albums of 2011 (Poland)
 List of best-selling albums in Brazil
 List of top 25 albums for 2009 in Australia
 List of albums which have spent the most weeks on the UK Albums Chart
 List of best-selling albums by women
 List of best-selling albums of the 21st century

Notes

References

External links 
 
 

2008 albums
Beyoncé albums
Columbia Records albums
Concept albums
Grammy Award for Best Contemporary R&B Album
Albums produced by Bangladesh (record producer)
Albums produced by Beyoncé
Albums produced by Jim Jonsin
Albums produced by Rico Love
Albums produced by Rodney Jerkins
Albums produced by Ryan Tedder
Albums produced by Sean Garrett
Albums produced by Stargate
Albums produced by Toby Gad
Albums produced by Tricky Stewart
Albums recorded at Chung King Studios
Albums recorded at Electric Lady Studios